The Arthur River is a river in Fiordland, New Zealand. It flows into Milford Sound and the final section of the Milford Track follows the river.

Lake Ada was dammed by a landslide about 900 years ago.

Pāteke lived on the river until the mid-1990s, when stoats spread to the valley. Stoat control, to protect whio, began in 2003 and was extended to the Joes River valley in 2005. Pāteke were reintroduced from a captive breeding stock in 2009, with further releases in 2010 and 2011.

See also
List of rivers of New Zealand

References

Land Information New Zealand - Search for Place Names

External links 

Photos - Lake Ada hut and track 1900, river rapids 1905, Lake Ada 1905, landing stage 1906, submerged forest 1921

Rivers of Fiordland